Gamma Comae Berenices, Latinized from γ Comae Berenices, is a single, orange-hued star in the northern constellation of Coma Berenices. It is faintly visible to the naked eye, having an apparent visual magnitude of 4.36. Based upon an annual parallax shift of 19.50 mas as seen from Earth, its distance can be estimated as around 167 light years from the Sun. The star is moving away from the Sun with a radial velocity of  +3 km/s.

The suffix notation indicates the star displays an overabundance of iron in its spectrum. It is most likely (91% chance) on the horizontal branch with an age of 2.7 billion years. If this is true, then it has an estimated 1.65 times the mass of the Sun and has expanded to nearly 12 times the Sun's radius. The star is radiating 58 times the Sun's luminosity from its enlarged photosphere at an effective temperature of around 4,652 K. Gamma Comae Berenices appears as part of the Coma Star Cluster, although it is probably not actually a member of this cluster.

References

K-type giants
Coma Berenices
Comae Berenices, Gamma
Durchmusterung objects
Comae Berenices, 15
108381
060742
4737